Petrus Marinus Maria (Pierre) Wind (The Hague, 24 March 1965) is a Dutch cook who became well-known for his cooking programs on television. In 1997, TV producer Henriette Theunissen discovered him, and started the series De Eetfabriek (NPS) (1997-2000) with Wind as presenter, and Jahaga Bosscha.

Life 
Wind grew up in The Hague. He went to the MAVO and then followed a cooking serving course at the LTS. Subsequently, he obtained various professional diplomas and certificates and followed a course in Amsterdam.

On 28 August 2017, it was announced that Wind's tram restaurant, which previously existed as a mobile restaurant in the Hague, will have a permanent location in the city.

On 8 May 2020, Wind started corona cooking line and answered all questions in connection with cuisine. Since the lockdown due to the COVID-19 pandemic, he received many questions and queries via social media about people who want to continue eating healthy during the obligatory home isolation. That is why Wind has now set up a separate telephone line to better channel these questions.

On 4 June 2020, Wind's intention to open pull drop factory now that Haribo production stopped was published by Teller Report.

Career 

 Working in Michelin star businesses such as Seinpost, Saur, and Priness Juliana
 Chef and co-owner of restaurant De Nas
 Lecturer at the Francois Vatelschool for the subjects of beverage science, serving menu learning

Bibliography 

 Als schrijvers koken (1998)
 Wind aan de kook (1999); kookboek
 Wind in de eetfabriek (2000)
 Lekkâh! (2004); kookboek met illustraties van Haagse Harry.
 WAM (2005) ("Wind Afval Methode")
 De wondere wereld van een keukenkoning (2006)
 Patatje oorlog (2008); in samenwerking met Bart Chabot
 Het smaakpretpark (2009)

References

External links 
 Wind on IMDb
 Wind's official website
 De film "Feestje" op IMDb

Dutch chefs

1965 births
Living people
Dutch television personalities
Mass media people from The Hague
Cookbook writers